Roman Bezpalkiv – (April 15, 1938, village Hlushyn, Lviv region (Lviv Oblast) – November 19, 2009, Lviv) – was a Ukrainian painter. Genre – painting, sacral art. Member of the National Union of Artists of Ukraine (1988). Honored Artist of Ukraine (1998).

1962 graduated from Lviv Medical Institute. In 1965 he enrolled in Lviv National Academy of Arts and finished it in 1971.

From 1970 he worked as a teacher of painting in Lviv College of Decorative and Applied Arts named after Ivan Trush.

Author of many scenic and of sacral of works, among them philosophical portraits of figures of Ukrainian culture as Taras Shevchenko, Bohdan Ihor Antonych, Markiyan Shashkevych, Ivan Vyshenskyi, Kateryna Bilokur and others. Participated in the personal, national and international exhibitions.

He died after a long illness Nov. 19, 2009, and was buried in the Lychakiv Cemetery, Lviv.

Notes

References 
 Оля Малерик. Портрети-притчі від Романа Безпалківа 
 Роман Безпалків – мандрівник з Академічної 
 Roman Bezpalkiv
  У Львові виставкою-реквіємом пом’януть «Адмірала» – Романа Безпалківа, який помер 20 листопада

Literature 

  .

Philosophers of art
1938 births
2009 deaths
Burials at Lychakiv Cemetery
20th-century Ukrainian painters
20th-century Ukrainian male artists
21st-century Ukrainian painters
21st-century Ukrainian male artists
Ukrainian male painters